The nuraghe Santu Sciori (also known as Santu Luxori in the Sardinian language or San Lussorio in Italian) is a nuraghe located in the municipality of Pabillonis in Sardinia.

It was made in the mid-Bronze Age (1600–1300 BC) and it covers an area of 2,400 square meters. Remains of skeletons have been found near the site indicating a necropolis. 19th-century historian Vittorio Angius described it as important among the big nuraghes of Sardinia.

Description 
The nuraghe was made entirely from basaltic rocks, having a complex structure with a polylobate bastion and towers underground. Above it there is a church erected in 1970 in honor of St. Lussorio. Near there is another ancient church below which there is another small nuraghe.

Gallery

References

Bibliography
 Vittorio Angius, Città e villaggi della Sardegna dell' Ottocento, Illisso Editori, 2006

Buildings and structures in Sardinia
Archaeological sites in Sardinia
Nuraghe